Interlink Airlines Pty Ltd. was an airline based in Johannesburg, South Africa, operating scheduled and chartered flights (including medical rescue, and VIP transport services) out of OR Tambo International Airport. Its IATA code has since been reassigned to Batik Air.

History
Interlink Airlines was founded in 1998. After long-lasting financial troubles, the airline had to suspend all of its flights on 22 February 2010, and went into liquidation on 2 March.

Destinations

In October 2009, Interlink Airlines operated scheduled services to the following destinations:
Burundi
Bujumbura - Bujumbura International Airport
Saudi Arabia
Jeddah - King Abdulaziz International Airport
South Africa
Cape Town - Cape Town International Airport
Durban - King Shaka International Airport
Johannesburg - OR Tambo International Airport base
Kruger National Park - Kruger Mpumalanga International Airport
Pretoria - Wonderboom Airport

Fleet
At its height, Interlink operated a fleet of four Boeing 737-200 aircraft (equipped with 106 passenger seats, 18 of which were in business class), the first of which had been acquired in October 2005. By late 2009, all but one had been withdrawn from service. Additionally, between 2006 and 2007, the airline was in possession of two smaller Embraer EMB 120 Brasilia aircraft.

References

Defunct airlines of South Africa
Airlines established in 1998
Airlines disestablished in 2010
2010 disestablishments in South Africa
Companies based in Johannesburg
South African companies established in 1998